Baldwin may refer to:

 Baldwin (hamlet), New York (pop. 24,033), a community in the Town of Hempstead on Long Island
 Baldwin (town), New York (pop. 832), a town in Chemung County outside of Elmira